Kofi Pare (born 28 November 1938) is a Ghanaian former footballer. He competed in the men's tournament at the 1964 Summer Olympics.

References

External links
 
 

1938 births
Living people
Ghanaian footballers
Ghana international footballers
Olympic footballers of Ghana
Footballers at the 1964 Summer Olympics
1963 African Cup of Nations players
1965 African Cup of Nations players
Africa Cup of Nations-winning players
Place of birth missing (living people)
Association football midfielders